The 1938 Tour de Suisse was the sixth edition of the Tour de Suisse cycle race and was held from 6 August to 14 August 1938. The race started and finished in Bern. The race was won by Giovanni Valetti.

General classification

References

1938
Tour de Suisse